Adolfo Carrau (born 10 June 1975) is a Uruguayan sailor. He competed in the Laser event at the 2000 Summer Olympics.

References

External links
 
 

1975 births
Living people
Uruguayan male sailors (sport)
Olympic sailors of Uruguay
Sailors at the 2000 Summer Olympics – Laser
Place of birth missing (living people)